The Evening Standard Theatre Award for Best Musical Performance is an annual award presented since 2013 by the Evening Standard in recognition of achievement in British theatre.

Winners and nominees

Multiple awards and nominations

Awards 
2 awards

 Rosalie Craig

Nominations 
3 nominations

 Rosalie Craig

2 nominations

 Sheridan Smith

See also 

 Laurence Olivier Award for Best Actor in a Musical
 Laurence Olivier Award for Best Actress in a Musical
 Tony Award for Best Actor in a Musical
 Tony Award for Best Actress in a Musical

References 

Theatre acting awards
Award ceremonies
Evening Standard Awards